Victoria Jane Bowman (née Robinson; born 12 June 1966) is a former British diplomat who served as UK Ambassador to Myanmar between 2002 and 2006. She has been Director of the Myanmar Centre for Responsible Business (MCRB) since July 2013.

She was educated at The Dragon School, Oxford High School, Pembroke College, Cambridge and the University of Chicago. 

Bowman first served as a junior diplomat in what was then called Burma in 1990.

On 24 August 2022, she was reportedly detained at her home in Yangon along with her husband Htein Lin, a prominent artist and former political prisoner, and charged with immigration offences. In September 2022 she was sentenced to one year in prison for staying at an address different to the one she had registered under.

On November 17 2022, the Myanmar military released Bowman along with 6000 prisoners to mark Myanmar National Day, she was subsequently deported.

References

1966 births
Living people
People educated at Oxford High School, England
Alumni of Pembroke College, Cambridge
Ambassadors of the United Kingdom to Myanmar
British women ambassadors
21st-century British diplomats